Trechus angusticeps is a species of ground beetle in the subfamily Trechinae. It was described by Apfelbeck in 1904.

References

angusticeps
Beetles described in 1904